The women's 800 metres at the 2007 All-Africa Games were held on July 18–19.

Medalists

Results

Heats
Qualification: First 2 of each heat (Q) and the next 2 fastest (q) qualified for the final.

Final

References
Results

800